Raymond Porter is an American actor and audiobook narrator who is most widely known for portraying the DC Comics villain Darkseid in Zack Snyder's Justice League.

Career
After appearing in many television shows, he gained attention when he was cast as Darkseid in the 2017 film Justice League, becoming the first actor to have been cast as the character in a live action feature film. However, Darkseid did not appear in the theatrical cut, meaning Zack Snyder's Justice League marked the character's first appearance in a live-action film. Porter played Darkseid through the use of motion capture and "went through a few different vocal gymnastics trying to figure out the voice".

Filmography

Film

Television

Video games

Audiobook

Awards and nominations

Audiobook Narration

References

External links
 

Living people
20th-century American actors
21st-century American actors
American male film actors
American male television actors
American male voice actors
Year of birth missing (living people)